Events from the year 1746 in Spain.

Incumbents
Monarch - Philip V (until July 9), Ferdinand VI (starting July 9)

Deaths
28 June - Andrés Fernández Pacheco, 10th Duke of Escalona, grandee and academician. (b. 1710)
July 9 - Philip V of Spain (b. 1683)

References

 
1740s in Spain
Years of the 18th century in Spain